Illiniichthys is an extinct genus of prehistoric bony fish that lived during the late Moscovian stage of the Pennsylvanian epoch.

See also

 Prehistoric fish
 List of prehistoric bony fish

References

Pennsylvanian fish
Palaeonisciformes